Clementine is a 2004 action-drama film directed by Kim De-yeong. In this film, the actor Steven Seagal plays a 10-minute role as "cage fight champion" Jack Miller. The film is about Kim Seung-hyeon, a taekwondo champion who decides to give up his fighting career for good in order to take care of his daughter Sarang. But when an evil gambling kingpin kidnaps Sarang, Kim must agree to fight in a rigged boxing match in exchange for Sarang's freedom.

Upon release, the film failed at the box office and received negative reviews from critics, but has been considered a cult film by some.

References

External links
 
 

2004 films
2000s action drama films
South Korean multilingual films
American multilingual films
South Korean films about revenge
2004 multilingual films
South Korean action drama films
2000s Korean-language films
Taekwondo films
Martial arts tournament films
2000s South Korean films